Simaluguri Junction railway station  is a railway station on the Lumding–Dibrugarh section. It is located in Sivasagar in the Indian state of Assam. Its code is SLGR. It serves Simaluguri town. The station consists of three platforms. Simaluguri Junction is the main railway station in the Sivasagar district of Assam.

History
The station lies on Amguri-Simaluguri section on West side, Simaluguri-Dibrugarh section in North and Simaluguri-Sripuriagaon section in East. All this lines comes under Lumding–Dibrugarh section. Simaluguri-Naginimora section is Gauge Conversion once completed it connect Sibsagar with Nagaland. Total length of the project is 16.9 kilometres.

Survey for 344 km (214 mi)-long new line from Jorhat to Sibsagar was completed in 2010–11 which will reduce the distance between Jorhat and Dibrugarh.

Also See 

 Sibsagar Town railway station

References 

Railway stations in Sivasagar district
Tinsukia railway division